Kent County Council held its elections on 5 May 2005, on the same day as the 2005 United Kingdom general election. They were followed by the 2009 Kent County Council election.

Elections were held in all divisions across Kent, excepting Medway Towns which is a unitary authority.

Summary of 2005 results
Elections were held in 2005 across Kent.

References

2005 English local elections
2005
2000s in Kent